Rupinder Kaur Gill, better known as Roopi Gill, is a Canadian model and actress who mostly works in the Punjabi Film Industry. She rose to fame with her performance in the music video for the song "Diamond", by Gurnam Bhullar. She started her acting career with Ashke (2018), for which she received a PTC Punjabi Film Awards nomination for Best Supporting Actress. Also, she appeared in the music video of "Stranger" song by Diljit Dosanjh. She has frequently collaborated with Sukh Sanghera for music videos and films. In 2019, she appeared in Laiye Je Yaarian, for which she received PTC Critics Award for Best Actress.

Career 

Roopi Gill started her career, featuring in Karan Aujla's "Yaarian Ch Fikk" music video. Gill made her feature film debut with the film Ashke in 2018. The film was produced by Rhythm Boyz Entertainment and directed by Amberdeep Singh. She played role of a teacher called "Noor". Her performance was acclaimed by critics and audiences, and she was nominated for the "Best Supporting Actress" award at the PTC Punjabi Film Awards. She later starred in the 2018 film Vadda Kalakaar. In 2019, she appeared as a lead actress in Laiye Je Yaarian, her second collaboration with Rhythm Boyz and Amrinder Gill. Her performance in the film was praised by critics, and received a PTC nomination for Best Actress.

Filmography

Music videos 

 "Dildariyan" - Raj Ranjodh
 "Stranger" - Diljit Dosanjh
 "Diamond" - Gurnam Bhullar
 "Jandi Jandi" - Seera Buttar
 "Rang Gora" - Akhil
 "Scratch" - Gursewak Dhillon
 "Kamli" - Mankirt Aulakh
 "Tareyaan De Des" - Prabh Gill
 "Yaarian Ch Fikk" - Karan Aujla
"Majha Block" - Prem Dhillon
"Judge"- Mankrit Aulakh

Awards and nominations

References

External links 
 

Living people
Indian film actresses
21st-century Indian actresses
1997 births